The Dartmouth Big Green men's basketball program, formerly the Dartmouth Indians, is the intercollegiate men's basketball program of Dartmouth College in Hanover, New Hampshire. The program is classified in the NCAA Division I and the team competes in the Ivy League. They play their home games at Leede Arena and are coached by David McLaughlin.

The Big Green have not had a winning record since going 14–12 in the 1998–99 season. They have not participated in an NCAA Tournament since 1959, the longest active streak in between appearances and the 2nd longest ever. Since their last tournament appearance, they have only had 10 winning seasons and only participated in any postseason tournament once, the 2015 CollegeInsider.com Postseason Tournament.

Postseason results

NCAA tournament results
The Big Green have appeared in the NCAA tournament seven times with two national championship game appearances. Their combined record is 10–7. Dartmouth, along with Kansas, was the first team to appear in multiple NCAA Tournaments after making their second appearance in the 1942 tournament. They were also the first team to appear in consecutive tournaments.

CIT results
The Big Green have appeared in the CollegeInsider.com Postseason Tournament (CIT) one time. Their record is 0–1.

Notable players
Alex Barnett (2005–2009)
James Blackwell (1987–1991)
Al Bonniwell (1937–1939)
Flinder Boyd (1998–2002)
Aud Brindley (1942–46)
Rudy LaRusso (1956–59)
Ed Leede (1945–49)
Bob MacLeod (1935–1939)
Gabrielius Maldūnas (2011–15)
Ian McGinnis (1997–2001)
Dick McGuire (1944)
George Munroe (1940–43)
Jim Olsen (1940–43)
Crawford Palmer (1992–93)
Walter Palmer (1986–1990)
Jim Picken (1924–1927)
Clive Weeden (2007-2011)

References

External links